Lucy Rogers is an American politician and a member of the Democratic Party who has served in the Vermont House of Representatives since 2019.

Rogers serves on the House Committee on Health Care and on the Canvassing Committee.

Rogers was 23 years old, and had just graduated from the University of Vermont, when she won her first election for an open Vermont state House seat represented by Republican Rep. Bernie Juskiewicz, who was retiring at the end of his term. Her campaign made national news when she played a duet with her opponent, Republican Zac Mayo.

References

External links

Living people
Democratic Party members of the Vermont House of Representatives
Women state legislators in Vermont
Year of birth missing (living people)
University of Vermont alumni
People from Waterville, Vermont
21st-century American politicians
21st-century American women politicians